Francis Taylor (1845 – 1 September 1915) was an English brewer and Liberal and Liberal Unionist politician.

Taylor was the third son of Alfred Lombe Taylor of Diss, Norfolk. The Taylor family had property in Diss and had an interest in "Taylor and Dowson's" one of the brewers in the town. Taylor became a partner in the brewery and inherited the interests of his father in the town, living at the Manor House in Mount Street.

In 1885 Taylor was elected as Member of Parliament for South Norfolk as a Liberal, and in 1886 became a Liberal Unionist. He held the seat until 1898 when he retired through ill-health. He died in Diss on 1 September 1915.

References

External links
 

1845 births
1915 deaths
UK MPs 1885–1886
UK MPs 1886–1892
UK MPs 1892–1895
UK MPs 1895–1900
Liberal Party (UK) MPs for English constituencies
Liberal Unionist Party MPs for English constituencies
People from Diss, Norfolk